Robert Leonard Carneiro (June 4, 1927 – June 24, 2020) was an American  anthropologist and curator of the American Museum of Natural History. His Circumscription Theory explains how early political states may have formed as a result of interactions between environmental constraints, population pressures, and warfare.

Carneiro took his first course in anthropology as an undergraduate at the University of Michigan, while studying Political Science with the goal of becoming a lawyer. As a graduation gift, his father (who hoped his son would run the family business someday) arranged for a trip around the globe on an ocean liner. After the trip, Carneiro began work at his father's company, manufacturing presses used to print magazines and newspapers.

Travelling the world, however, had fueled his interest in anthropology; so, Carneiro returned to the University of Michigan. His graduate research took him to Brazil where fieldwork with an indigenous people, the Kuikuro, revealed large earthworks and ancient trenches. Based on those observations, he earned a Ph.D. in 1957, and went on to teach at several universities.

Carneiro was an influential cultural evolutionist. He worked toward a general theory, to explain the emergence of political culture, strongly opposed to humanistic and non-scientific tendencies in anthropology. His work remains influential, but also has its critics.

List of selected works

 "The Transition From Quantity to Quality: A Neglected Causal Mechanism in Accounting for Social Evolution." Proceedings of the National Academy of Sciences 97 (2000): 12926-12931.
 "Process vs. Stages: A False Dichotomy in Tracing the Rise of the State." In Alternatives of Social Evolution. Ed. by Nikolay Kradin, Andrey Korotayev, Dmitri Bondarenko, Victor de Munck, and Paul Wason, pp. 52–58. Vladivostok: Far Eastern Branch of the Russian Academy of Sciences, 2000.
 The Muse of History and the Science of Culture. New York: Kluwer Academic/Plenum Publishers, 2000 
 "What Happened at Flashpoint? Conjectures on Chiefdom Formation at the Very Moment of Conception." In Chiefdoms and Chieftaincy in the Americas. Ed. by Elsa M. Redman, pp. 18–42. Gainesville: University Press of Florida, 1998.
 Evolutionism in Cultural Anthropology: A Critical History. Westview Press, Boulder, CO, 2003.
 The Evolution of the Human Mind From Supernaturalism to Naturalism, An Anthropological Perspective. New York: Eliot Werner Publications, Inc., 2010.
 The Checkered History of the Circumscription Theory. AuthorHouse, Bloomington, IN, 2018.

See also
Stephen K. Sanderson

References

1927 births
2020 deaths
Anthropology writers
American anthropologists
Brazilianists
University of Michigan alumni
People associated with the American Museum of Natural History
Members of the United States National Academy of Sciences
Fellows of the American Academy of Arts and Sciences